Otis Grant Collins (May 2, 1917 – January 1, 1992) was a businessman and politician in Illinois.

Otis was born in Camden, Mississippi and was an African-American. He moved to Chicago, Illinois with his family. Collins served in the United States Military during World War II. He went to Wilson Junior College, Northwestern University, and Roosevelt University. Collins was involved in the insurance and real estate business and was involved in the labor union movement. Collins served in the Illinois House of Representatives from 1965 to 1973 and was a Democrat. Collins died in Detroit, Michigan. Collins was married to Earlean Collins who also served in the Illinois General Assembly. They then separated.

Notes

'

1917 births
1992 deaths
People from Madison County, Mississippi
Businesspeople from Chicago
Politicians from Chicago
Military personnel from Illinois
Northwestern University alumni
Roosevelt University alumni
Democratic Party members of the Illinois House of Representatives
African-American state legislators in Illinois
African Americans in World War II